Omar Slaimankhel (born 4 March 1992) is a New Zealand professional rugby footballer who plays rugby league for Western Suburbs in the Ron Massey Cup. Slaimankhel previously played in the National Rugby League for the New Zealand Warriors before switching to rugby union and playing for Japanese team, Canon Eagles.

Early life
Slaimankhel was born in Pakistan to Afghan refugees. When he was two years old his family moved to New Zealand.

Slaimankhel grew up playing rugby union until he switched codes to join the New Zealand Warriors rugby league development side. He played in the first XV for Auckland Grammar School, where he was also a track athlete and weightlifter.

Playing career
Slaimankhel made his first grade debut for the Warriors on 16 June 2012 against the Cronulla Sharks. He played five games for the Warriors before taking up a lucrative deal with Japanese rugby union club Canon Eagles. This stint in Japanese rugby union would ultimately be Salimankhel's last appearances in top-tier football of either code, as he never cracked another NRL side despite joining their feeder clubs.

In mid-2015 Slaimankhel returned to rugby league, signing with the Sydney Roosters. He played for the Roosters feeder club, the Wyong Roos, in the New South Wales Cup. On 27 September, he was named at fullback in the 2015 New South Wales Cup Team of the Year. Slaimankhel played for the Roosters in the 2016 NRL Auckland Nines; however, he suffered an arm injury on the second day of competition.  Slaimankhel played for The Auburn Warriors in The NSW Ron Massey Cup competition for two seasons. 
After Auburn were excluded from the competition he joined The Mount Pritchard Mounties for the 2018 season.

In 2019, Slaimankhel joined the Western Suburbs Ron Massey Cup team.   On 6 May 2019, Slaimankhel was selected for the Ron Massey Cup representative side to play against Newcastle Rebels.

Television appearance 
Slaimankhel appears on the eighteenth season of The Block along with his friend Oz. On the show they are known as the ‘bathroom kings’ winning all bathroom related rooms.

References

External links
Sydney Roosters profile

1992 births
Living people
Afghan emigrants to New Zealand
Afghan expatriates in Pakistan
Asian Games competitors for Afghanistan
Auburn Warriors players
Mount Pritchard Mounties players
New Zealand rugby league players
New Zealand rugby union players
New Zealand Warriors players
People educated at Auckland Grammar School
Junior Kiwis players
Rugby league wingers
Rugby league fullbacks
Rugby union players at the 2018 Asian Games
Wyong Roos players
Yokohama Canon Eagles players